Cyathopus is a genus of Himalayan plants in the grass family. The only known species is Cyathopus sikkimensis, native to the mountains of Bhutan, Yunnan, Sikkim, Nepal, Uttarakhand, and nearby regions.

References

Pooideae
Flora of Yunnan
Flora of Nepal
Flora of West Himalaya
Flora of East Himalaya
Monotypic Poaceae genera